The 16 Divisions of construction, as defined by the Construction Specifications Institute (CSI)'s MasterFormat, is the most widely used standard for organizing specifications and other written information for commercial and institutional building projects in the U.S. and Canada. In 2004, MasterFormat was updated and expanded to 50 Divisions. It provides a master list of divisions, and section numbers and titles within each division, to follow in organizing information about a facility's construction requirements and associated activities. Standardizing the presentation of such information improves communication among all parties involved in construction projects.

Divisions
The following are the sixteen divisions listed in the Master Format 1995 Edition.

 Division 01 — General Requirement
 Division 02 — Site Works
 Division 03 — Concrete
 Division 04 — Masonry
 Division 05 — Metals
 Division 06 — Wood and Plastics
 Division 07 — Thermal and Moisture Protection
 Division 08 — Doors and Windows
 Division 09 — Finishes
 Division 10 — Specialties
 Division 11 — Equipment
 Division 12 — Furnishings
 Division 13 — Special Construction
 Division 14 — Conveying Systems
 Division 15 — Mechanical/Plumbing
 Division 16 — Electrical
DIVISION 17 -   MASTER FORMAT RELATED SPECS, NONCONFORMING TO THE ABOVE CSI   SECTIONSAll spec divisions higher than 16 are placed  in Division 17 - Others. Also use  Division 17-Others for any spec-shaped material not easily classified (e.g.,  geotechnical, pre-bid notes, etc.)

References

External links
MasterFormat information from CSI

Construction documents